Kamiya-chō-higashi is a Hiroden station (tram stop) on Hiroden Main Line and Hiroden Ujina Line, located in Kamiya-chō 1-chōme, Naka-ku, Hiroshima, Japan. To the station take underground pass through Kamiya-chō Shareo.

Routes 
From Kamiya-chō-higashi Station, there are three of Hiroden Streetcar routes.

  Hiroshima Station - Hiroshima Port Route
  Hiroshima Station - Hiroden-miyajima-guchi Route
 Hiroshima Station - Eba Route

Connections 
█ Main Line / █ Ujina Line

Tate-machi — Kamiya-chō-higashi — Hondōri

█ Main Line
 
Tate-machi — Kamiya-chō-higashi — Kamiya-chō-nishi

Other services connections 
█ Astram Line
Astram Line Connections at Astram Hondōri Station
Astram Line Connections at Astram Kenchō-mae Station

█ Bus Service Routes
Bus Service Route Connections at Hiroshima Bus Center

Around station 
Kamiya-chō Shareo
Hiroshima Bus Center
Sogo
ALSOK Hall
Hiroshima Peace Memorial
Hiroshima Peace Memorial Park
Hiroshima Municipal Stadium

History 
Opened as "" on November 23, 1912.
Rebuilt and renamed to "Kamiya-chō-higashi" on November 1, 2001.

See also 
Hiroden Streetcar Lines and Routes
List of railway stations in Japan

External links

Hiroden Main Line stations
Hiroden Ujina Line stations
Railway stations in Japan opened in 1912